The following events occurred in December 1974:

December 1, 1974 (Sunday)
 In Yangon, the U Thant funeral crisis occurs.
 TWA Flight 514, a Boeing 727, crashes 25 miles (40 km) northwest of Dulles International Airport during bad weather, killing all 92 people on board. The same day, in Havershaw, another plane of the same class crashes, causing the death of the three crew members.
 In Abilene, Texas, six employees of Gulf Refining Company die when they are overcome by methane fumes in a trench while attempting to repair a pipeline leak.

December 2, 1974 (Monday)
 In Addis Ababa, the City Hall and to the Webi Shebeli Hotel are bombed, carried out (according to the international press) by Eritrean nationalists. The Derg (revolutionary council) use the bombings as a pretext for hardened repression against the notables of the negus' regime.
British commercial diver David Keane drowns after his umbilical is cut through while conducting a bell dive in the Celtic Sea.
 Died: Sylvi Kekkonen, 74, First Lady of Finland.

December 3, 1974 (Tuesday)
 The Pioneer 11 probe enters the shadow of Jupiter ( from the planet's atmosphere) and captures famous images of the Great Red Spot.

December 4, 1974 (Wednesday)

 Jean-Paul Sartre visits Andreas Baader in the Stuttgart jail.
 In Sri Lanka, crash of Martinair Flight 138.

December 5, 1974 (Thursday)

 In Argelato (Bologna), the brigadier of carabinieri Andrea Lombardini, in a routine patrol, is murdered with gunfire by five terrorists, who were preparing a robbery on a security officer. The killers, quickly arrested, are members of Lavoro Illegale ("Illegal work"), a terrorist organization come out of Potere Operaio, under the inspiration of Toni Negri, and later merged into the Red brigades. One of them, Bruno Valli, four days later hangs himself in jail. The month in Italy also sees a series of demonstrative attacks by the Red Brigades against industrial managers.
 Dead: Pietro Germi, 60, actor and director, author of many masterpieces of neo-realism and Italian comedy.

December 6, 1974 (Friday)

 Died: Nikolaj Gerasimovič Kuznecov, 70, Soviet admiral

December 7, 1974 (Saturday)

 In Arcore, the self-styled prince Luigi D'Angerio, leaving the Silvio Berlusconi's villa, luckily escapes a kidnapping. The probable organizer of the abduction is the Mafioso Vittorio Mangano, Berlusconi's groom, arrested for fraud twenty days later. The episode, never fully explained, will raise many suspicions in the following decades about the presumed links between the Milanese businessman and organized crime.

December 8, 1974 (Sunday)
 In Greece, a referendum (Greek republic referendum, 1974) confirms the end of the monarchy and the republican form of the state, with 69.4% of votes.
 The Sistina Theatre in Rome debuts Aggiungi un posto a tavola (Add a seat at the table), a musical comedy by Garinei and Giovannini, music by Armando Trovajoli. The piece, a modern version of the Noah story, with Johnny Dorelli in the leading role of a witty country priest, gets an unheard-of success, staying on stage for a whole season, and becomes a classic of the Italian light theater.

December 9, 1974 (Monday)

 The Paris summit, reuniting the European Communities' heads of state and government, commences. It states the institution of the European Council and of the ERDF (European regional development fund) and the direct election of the European Parliament by citizens.
 In Japan, Takeo Miki becomes First Minister.
 Born: in Milan, Pippa Bacca, performer, killed in 2008 during a pacifist tour.

December 10, 1974 (Tuesday)

 The United Nations General Assembly Resolution 3275 declares 1975 International Women's Year.

December 11, 1974 (Wednesday)
 Born: in Chula Vista, Rey Mysterio, American professional wrestler.

December 12, 1974 (Thursday)
 The Supreme Court of Cassation transfers all the running enquiries about the Piazza Fontana bombing to the Catanzaro's seat. The decision avoids the incrimination of Admiral Eugenio Henke, former director of the SID, by the Milan Procure, for the false leads fulfilled by the secret services.

December 13, 1974 (Friday)

 Malta becomes a republic.
 The United States Congress unanimously approves the Jackson–Vanik amendment, linking the execution of the commercial treaties with Soviet Union to a more liberal politic by Moscow about Jewish emigration.
 In London, the Worsley Hotel is destroyed by arson (seven victims)
 North Vietnam launches the Spring Offensive with the Battle of Phước Long, which led to the collapse of South Vietnam.
 Died: Robert Bennett, 55, American Olympic hammer thrower

December 14, 1974 (Saturday)
 The enquiry of the Padua procure about the "Compass Rose", an extreme-right secret society planning a military coup, causes the arrest of General Ugo Ricci, charged with conspiracy against the state. Two weeks later (on December 30), the Supreme Court of Cassation transfers the enquiry to Rome, with a decision much discussed and seen as a cover-up.
 The Italian ministry of Cultural Heritage and Environment (now the Ministry of Cultural Heritage and Activities and Tourism) is instituted by decree; its first holder is Giovanni Spadolini.
 Died: Walter Lippmann, 85, American journalist

December 15, 1974 (Sunday)
 In Nicaragua, constitution of the UDEL (Union Democratica de Liberacion, Democratic liberation Union), representing the moderate and non-violent wing of the opposition to the Somoza regime.
 Died: Anatole Litvak, 72, American director of Ukrainian origin

December 16, 1974 (Monday)

 The army of Mali invades the French Upper Volta territory. The border conflict between the two countries will last till 1985.

December 17, 1974 (Tuesday)
 The World Intellectual Property Organization (WIPO) becomes a specialized agency of the United Nations.
 The United Nations Security Council Resolution 366 terminates South Africa's mandate over Namibia.
 British commercial diver J. Phillips is sucked into a  pipeline valve opening and killed while working from a jet barge at Scapa Flow in the North Sea.
 Born: in Los Angeles, Giovanni Ribisi and his twin sister Marissa, American actors.

December 18, 1974 (Wednesday)

 1974 Bristol bombing: The Provisional IRA bombs Bristol, England, injuring 20 people
Born: Mutassim Gaddafi, Libyan Army commander, son of Muammar Gaddafi, in Tripoli (d. 2011)

December 19, 1974 (Thursday)

 Oxford Street bombing
 Born: Ricky Ponting, former Australian international cricketer (and two-time World Cup winning captain) in Launceston, Tasmania.
 Died: Gunnar Andersson, 51, Swedish aviator (helicopter crash)

December 20, 1974 (Friday)

 In France, Veil law, legalizing abortion, with the favorable vote of UDF and leftist parties and the blackball of UDR..

December 21, 1974 (Saturday)

 The New York Times  reveals illegal domestic spying by the CIA.

December 22, 1974 (Sunday)
 Referendum on independence from France in the islands of Comore (95% yes) and Mayotte (63% no).
 In Maturin, Venezuela, crash of Avensa Flight 358 (73 victims).
 Died: Fosco Giachetti, 72, Italian actor, star of the fascist cinema

December 23, 1974 (Monday)
 37-year-old Karl Brushaber of Ann Arbor, Michigan, falls to his death from the top of Tuckerman Ravine while descending Mount Washington. Brushaber's climbing partner had turned back due to bad weather, but Brushaber pressed on toward the summit; whether or not he reached it is unknown.
 Gerald Ford, in a conversation/interview with James Alsop, declares as very probable in 1975 a new war in the Middle East and a world crisis, following the economic breakdown of a "European country, allied to the United States" (the United Kingdom or Italy).

December 24, 1974 (Tuesday)

 Darwin, Australia is almost completely destroyed by Cyclone Tracy.
 A first fashion retailer, Zara Store open in A Coruña, Spain.

December 25, 1974 (Wednesday)
 At the Vatican, Pope Paul VI inaugurates the 1975 Jubilee. During the rite of opening the Holy Door, some falling rubble nearly hits the pontiff.
Born: Ed Husain, British author and activist, in London
 Died: Giacomo Devoto, 77, Italian linguist, author of a celebrated dictionary of the Italian language

December 26, 1974 (Thursday)
 Launch of the Soviet space station Salyut 4.
 Died: Jack Benny, 80, American actor

December 27, 1974 (Friday)
 In Managua, an FSLN commando unit, headed by Eden Pastora, bursts into the house of Josè Maria Castillo, president of the Banco Central, and takes his guests hostage (including two relatives of the dictator Somoza). Three days later, thanks to the Managua archbishop's intermediation, the hostages are released, in exchange for a million dollars and the freedom of some political prisoners. Castillo is the only victim of the action.
 In Llevin (France), a firedamp explosion kills 42 miners.
 The Constitutional Court of Italy abolishes the articles of the penal code forbidding strikes for political reasons. The law, enacted by the Fascist regime, was by then mostly no longer applied, though formally in force.

December 28, 1974 (Saturday)
 Died:
Edwin Eugene Aldrin Sr., 78, United States Army aviator and officer, father of astronaut Buzz Aldrin
Giuseppe Dozza, 73, Italian Communist politician, popular mayor of Bologna

December 29, 1974 (Sunday)

 The Hunza earthquake in Pakistan.
 Died: Alessandro Cervellati, 82, Italian writer and painter, historian of circus and music-hall

December 30, 1974 (Monday)

 Agrarian reform in Honduras.
 Olean High School shooting.

December 31, 1974 (Tuesday)
 Restrictions on holding private gold within the United States, implemented by Franklin D. Roosevelt in 1933, are removed.
 Died: George Carey, 82, Canadian ice hockey right winger

References

1974
1974-12
1974-12